Serge Jean Mathieu Lancen (5 November 1922 – 10 July 2005) was a French composer and classical pianist.

Life 
Born in Paris, already in his earliest childhood Lancen developed an extraordinary interest in music. He completed the Conservatoire de Paris in piano with Marguerite Long and Lazare Lévy, harmony, counterpoint and musical composition with Tony Aubin and Noël Gallon. His exams were awarded a first prize. In 1950 he received the 2nd Prix de Rome for his cantata Bettina, the French Radio Composition Prize and other prizes and awards.

His oeuvre includes numerous compositions ranging from symphonic music to chamber music, concertos for piano, flute, double bass and harp, as well as two ballets and a chamber opera. Since 1960 he has devoted himself particularly to the creation of works for symphonic wind orchestra. His friend Désiré Dondeyne introduced him to this medium.

Lancen died in Paris on 10 July 2005.

Works

Pieces for Orchestra 
 1964 Charlot
 1965 Triptyque 
 1968 En route pour Monte-Carlo 
 1968 Fifres en fête
 1969 Symphonietta
 1993 Jeunes archets
 1993 Jeux pour musiciens (for wind ensemble)

Masses and religious works 
 1957 Narcisse profane oratorio
 1975 Poème œcuménique for nine soloists, mixed choir, children's choir, organ and symphony orchestra
 1986 Missa solemnis dedicated to John Paul II  for soprano, baritone, mixed choir, harp and symphonic wind orchestra
 Introit
 Kyrie
 Gloria
 Offertorium
 Sanctus
 Pater Noster
 Agnus Dei
 Communio
 Deo Gratias
 Alleluia
 1991 Te Deum for tenor solo, baritone solo, male choir and winds
 Te Deum Laudamus
 Tu Rex Gloriae, Christe
 Salvum fac populum tuum
 Miserere nostri, Domine
 Laudamus

Works for wind orchestra 
 1962 Manhattan Symphonie
 Arrivée à Manhattan
 Le Central Park
 Harlem
 Broadway
 Rockefeller Building
 1964 Symphonie de Noël
 Impressions of the first hours of the solemn Holy Night
 Joy and hope 
 Finale
 1967 Mini Symphonie
 1968 Festival à Kerkrade
 1969 Obsession
 1969–1970 Cap Kennedy
 1971 Hymne a la musique
 1971 Parade Concerto for piano and symphonic wind orchestra
 Introduction et Allegro
 Andantino
 Allegro
 1971 Ouverture texane
 1975 Marche pour un anniversaire
 1975 Symphonie de Paris
 1976 Ouverture triomphale
 1976 Rapsodie sui temi bretoni
 1976 Rhapsodie sur des thèmes Normands
 1977 Suite pastorale
 1979 Le Mont Saint Michel Tableaux Symphoniques - musical fresque in four movements
 Moderato / Allegro / Moderato - Near le Mont-Saint-Michel rising out of the fog and sand. Crossing the ramps that surround the heart of this small site. Climbing up to the abbey church. Discovering the incomparable panorama without horizon.
 Allegro Moderato - A patch of green, peaceful and unexpected.
 Maestoso - The proud fortress, its steep buttresses, its austere and echoing vaults.
 Moderato / Grandioso - The highest plan of the abbey, with its church, its monastery and the refectory of the monks. The shadow of the Mont-Saint-Michel stretches over the sand into the setting sun. As the night falls, "the miracle" rises from the darkness in the flames of the projectors. Like an arrow, the cathedral and statue of St. Michael rise high above the floods.
 1980 Trianon for Band
 Moderato maestoso
 Allegro
 Allegro
 Moderato maestoso
 1980 Festival rhapsodie
 1980 Bocage
 1980 Versailles
 1980 Le Chant de l’Arbre
 1980 Hymne de Fraternité for choir and wind orchestra from the Poème œcuménique
 1981 Dédicace for alto saxophone and wind orchestra
 1983 Scandinave
 1984 Divertimento
 1984 Marche nuptiale
 1984 Concerto de Paris for piano and symphonic wind orchestra
 1986 Mascarade for brass quintet and brass orchestra
 Ouverture
 Columbine
 Pierrot
 Harlequin
 Mezzetin
 Spavento
 Le Vagabond
 Final
 1988 Concerto pour Trombone
 1986 Symphonie de l’Eau Water circuit in nature
 1986 Aunis et Saintonge en fête
 1988 Sonate Concertante for clarinet and wind orchestra
 1990 Concerto pour harpe
 1990 Divertimento pour petite orchestre d'harmonie
 1990 Eveil
 1990 Hymne au soleil
 1990–1991 Concerto pour cœur
 1991 Symphonie Ibérique
 Andante moderato - Allegro Viva
 Lento - Andante
 Andante - Allegro - Vivace
 1991 Concerto pour Hautbois
 Allegro
 Andante
 Allegro
 1993 Images d’Ollioules
 Allegro
 Andante
 Andante
 Allegro Vivo
 1993 Cinquantième
 1993 Symphonie joyeuse
 1993 Zwiefache Symphonique
 Allegro
 Allegretto
 Moderato
 Allegro
 1994 Remerciements for baritone, harp and harmony orchestra based on texts from the Bible and from prayers
 Introduction 
 Prière
 Remerciements à Dieu
 Benidicamus Domine
 Prière du Souvenir
 Gloire à Dieu - Alleluia
 1994 Credo for mixed four-part choir and harmony orchestra
 1995 Hymne aux musiciens
 1996 Espaces harmoniques for reciter, choirs and harmony orchestra
 1996 Jubilé
 1998 Jour de fête
 Contraste for alto saxophone and wind orchestra
 
 Ouverture pour un Matin d’Automne
 Copacabana

Stage works 
 1962 Mauvaise conscience, chamber opera

Concerts with accompaniment (orchestra, piano and other instruments) 
 1954 Concerto pour harmonica
 1962 Concerto pour flûte et orchestre 
 1962 Concerto pour contrebasse 
 1966 Concerto pour violon 
 1968 Concerto champêtre pour harpe et orchestre
 1974 Concerto Rhapsodie pour piano et orchestre 
 1985 Concerto pour violon et contrebasse 
 1987 Concerto pour contrebasse et orchestre 
 1988 Concerto pour harpe (also in a version for wind players) 
 1992 Concerto pour saxophone alto et orchestre

Bibliography 
 Jozef Robijns, Miep Zijlstra: Algemene muziekencyclopedie, Haarlem: De Haan, (1979)-1984, 
 Wolfgang Suppan, Armin Suppan: Das Neue Lexikon des Blasmusikwesens, 4th edition, Freiburg-Tiengen, Blasmusikverlag Schulz GmbH, 1994, 
 Paul E. Bierley, William H. Rehrig: The heritage encyclopedia of band music : composers and their music, Westerville, Ohio: Integrity Press, 1991, 
 Jean-Marie Londeix: Musique pour saxophone, volume II : répertoire général des œuvres et des ouvrages d' enseignement pour le saxophone, Cherry Hill: Roncorp Publications, 1985.
 Jean-Marie Londeix: 125 ans de musique pour saxophone, répertoire général des œuvres et des ouvrages d' enseignement pour le saxophone, Paris: Éditions Musicales, 1971.
 Nicole Lacombe, Alain Lacombe: Des compositeurs pour l'image (Cinéma et Teélévision), Neuilly sur Seine: Musique et promotion éditeur, 1982, 602 pages.

References

External links 
 Biography on Musica et Memoria
 
 Serge Lancen catalogue

1922 births
2005 deaths
20th-century French composers
20th-century French male classical pianists
Concert band composers
French male classical composers
French composers of sacred music
French opera composers
Musicians from Paris
Conservatoire de Paris alumni
Prix de Rome for composition